Sridhar V. Sambhram (mostly credited as V. Sridhar) is an Indian film score and soundtrack composer and lyricist in the Kannada film industry. Sridhar made his film debut in the 2008 musical blockbuster Mussanje Maathu for which he received critics and masses appreciation. Since then he has composed and scored background music for successful films like Krishnan Love Story (2009), Krishnan Marriage Story (2010),  Dubai Babu (2013), Jai Lalitha (2014) to name a few. He considers senior musician Hamsalekha as his mentor.

He has won Mirchi Award for Best Music Director for the film Krishnan Love Story (2012) and received a nomination at the 59th Filmfare Awards South for his composition for the film Krishnan Marriage Story. He won the Filmfare Award for the film Krishna Leela in 2015.
He is Melody King of current Kannada Music Industry

Discography

As a composer

References

External links
 
 V. Sridhar artist
 V. Sridhar filmography

Living people
Kannada film score composers
Kannada playback singers
Kannada-language lyricists
Indian male playback singers
Filmfare Awards South winners
Male film score composers
Year of birth missing (living people)